Isaac Butts IV (born May 28, 1989) is an American professional basketball player and podcast host who currently plays for  Koshigaya Alphas of the Japanese B-League. Isaac played high school basketball at Georgia Military College Prep School until 2007. He averaged 26 PPG and 17 RPG during his senior year. Upon high school graduation, he received a scholarship to attend Appalachian State University. Once he completed his collegiate career at Appalachian State, he was invited to participate in the Orlando Magic Summer League. In 2021, he and co-host Max Matsumoto created the IKEMAX Podcast where Japanese B-League basketball players discuss their experiences.

Career statistics 

|-
| align="left" | 2012–13
| align="left" | Moncton
| 36|| 20|| 29.1|| .603|| .000|| .549|| 11.1|| 1.44|| 0.36|| 1.61||  14.97
|-
| align="left" | 2013–14
| align="left" | SC Rasta Vechta
| 32|| 8|| 14.2|| .625|| .000|| .623|| 4.31|| 0.34|| 0.12|| 0.62||  5.5
|-
| align="left" | 2014–15
| align="left" | Nishinomyia
| 52|| 50|| 35.4|| .649|| .000|| .578|| 15.2|| 2.73|| 0.58|| 1.27||  17.06
|-
| align="left" | 2015–16
| align="left" | Mikawa
| 62|| 44|| 25.2|| .679|| .000|| .549|| 10.55|| 0.77|| 0.35|| 1.06||  9.89
|-
| align="left" | 2016–17
| align="left" | Mikawa
| 64|| 53|| 26.8|| .658|| .000|| .588|| 11.53|| 0.95|| 0.27|| 0.67||  9.22
|-
| align="left" | 2017–18
| align="left" | Mikawa
| 64|| 52|| 27.5|| .655|| .000|| .665|| 10.53|| 1.38|| 0.55|| 0.73||  9.86
|-
| align="left" | 2018–19
| align="left" | Mikawa
| 45 ||39 || 31.9|| .592|| .000|| .626 || 12.11|| 2.13|| 0.69|| 0.56|| 10.09
|-
| align="left" | 2019–20
| align="left" | Toyama
| 12|| 12|| 38.1|| .712|| .000|| .673|| 13.58|| 1.92|| 0.5|| 1.08||  16.25
|-
|}

References

External links 
Isaac Butts at RealGM
College bio
Isaac Butts at Asia-Basket.com
https://www.proballers.com/basketball/player/61761/isaac-butts 
https://www.youtube.com/c/IKEMAX

1989 births
Living people
American expatriate basketball people in Canada
American expatriate basketball people in Germany
American expatriate basketball people in Japan
American men's basketball players
Appalachian State Mountaineers men's basketball players
Koshigaya Alphas players
Moncton Miracles players
Nishinomiya Storks players
SC Rasta Vechta players
SeaHorses Mikawa players
Toyama Grouses players
Centers (basketball)